John Englart (born 1955), pseudonym Takver, is an Australian citizen journalist, photojournalist, Videographer and blogger from Melbourne.

His pseudonym was adopted in 1997 from a minor character in Ursula Le Guin's novel The Dispossessed. On his website he outlined a reason for adopting this pseudonym: "By adopting the name of Takver, I pay tribute to Ursula Le Guin and her humanism as a person and her skill and integrity as a writer. It is also an attempt to articulate that history is made by lots of ordinary people - not just governments, or the rich and famous."

Career

John Englart worked for Telstra Corporation for 31 years before being made redundant in 2005. He has worked in web design and web content administration since 1996. After being made redundant, he attended TAFE to do a dual Diploma in IT Web Development and Multimedia. After finishing his course he was employed in the web team at Northern Melbourne Institute of TAFE, now known as Melbourne Polytechnic.

Awards

John Englart received the Environmental Sustainability Award from Moreland Council in 2019 at the Moreland Awards ceremony for his continuing advocacy on climate action at the local level.

Citizen journalism

His work as a citizen journalist initially came to widespread public attention in the 1998 Australian waterfront dispute where he ran a website called Takver's Soapbox - War on the Wharfies that collated and paraphrased the daily news reports with his own reporting of Melbourne events to present an accurate and timely account sympathetic to the Maritime Union of Australia point of view as a pro-union anarchist.

The website was awarded LabourStart website of the week in April 1998.

The importance of his citizen journalism in this dispute has been noted in expanding how unions campaign online.

He documented the growing peace movement protests in Melbourne after the September 11 attacks on New York in 2001 and the subsequent invasion and occupation of Afghanistan and Iraq, including publishing an 80-page booklet covering the period from 2001 to 2007.

He has used his own website to publish a range of radical political and historical pamphlets and books, including by labour history researchers Dr Bob James on early Anarchism in Australia, trade unionism and benefit societies, and Issy Wyner on the Federated Ship Painters and Dockers Union.

For the Friends of the Earth Australia book published in 2004 on the history of Friends of the Earth campaigns in Australia he contributed an article on the Rides against Uranium in the 1970s, which he participated in. These events helped launch FoE to prominence as an environmental organisation in Australia.

In 2013 he joined Margo Kingston's team of citizen journalists for the Nofibs website to report the 2013 Australian federal election within individual electorates. Englart covered the candidates and issues for the Federal Division of Wills with Labor sitting MP Kelvin Thomson.

In 2014 some of Englart's early citizen photojournalism work of Gay Pride Week events in Sydney in 1973, donated to the Australian Lesbian and Gay Archives, were featured in a Melbourne photographic exhibition curated by Dr Marcus Bunyan.

"Notice the intimacy of the image here, getting in amongst the crowd, the photographer getting intimate with the crowd, getting involved with the action." described Dr Marcus Bunyan about one of Englart's photos.

Since 2004 Englart has gradually increased his focus on climate change and environmental issues in his journalism and blogging, and is involved in local groups Sustainable Fawkner and Climate Action Moreland. In 2015 Englart was an accredited NGO delegate for Climate Action Moreland and Climate Action Network Australia to the 2015 United Nations Climate Change Conference in Paris. Subsequently, he also attended  the 2016 United Nations Climate Change Conference  in Marrakech.

The importance of Englart's writing and online publishing has been recognised with two websites being permanently archived in the Pandora Archive of the National Library of Australia : the Radical Tradition website and the Climate Citizen Blog.

Awards

His contributions to activism as a founding member of Jura Books in 1977 and other activist book collectives plus his citizen journalism were recognised by the Eureka Australia Medal award conferred by Dr Joseph Toscano and the Anarchist Media Institute at Bakery Hill, Ballarat on 3 December 2009.

External links
 Takver Website 
 Climate Citizen Blog

References

Australian anarchists
Activists from Melbourne
1955 births
Living people
Australian photojournalists
Journalists from Melbourne
Bloggers from Melbourne